Dak Pek Camp (also known as Dak Pek Special Forces Camp) is a former U.S. Army and Army of the Republic of Vietnam (ARVN) base northwest of Kon Tum in the Central Highlands of Vietnam.

History
The 5th Special Forces Group first established a base at here in December 1962 to monitor communist infiltration along the Ho Chi Minh Trail. The base was located 14 km from the Laos border, 40 km south of Khâm Đức and approximately 85 km northwest of Kon Tum.

5th Special Forces Detachment A-749 was based here in October 1963, Detachment A-5 was based here in December 1964, Detachment A-211 was based here in 1965 and Detachment A-242 from October 1966. The base was also used as a launch site for MACV-SOG operations into Laos.

On 29 May 1968 a de Havilland Canada C-7B Caribou #62-4189 was hit by mortar fire as it landed at Dak Pek causing the right wing to separate, there were no casualties.

On 12 April 1970 a People's Army of Vietnam (PAVN) force estimated at two battalions attacked the camp. Sappers attacked many of the bunkers and the defenders were forced back to a small fighting position before air support forced the PAVN back. The siege of Dak Pek last until early May when the PAVN withdrew. Total losses were 34 CIDG and 420 PAVN killed. The PAVN simultaneously attacked the nearby Dak Seang Camp.

Other units based at Dak Pek included:
6th Battalion, 29th Artillery
57th Assault Helicopter Company (Bell AH-1G HueyCobra)
1st Battalion, 92nd Artillery

The base was transferred to 88th Border Rangers on 30 November 1970. In April 1972 Fairchild AC-119 AC-119K Stinger gunships killed 98 PAVN around Dak Pek.

Current use
The base has been turned over to forestry and housing and sits adjacent to the Ho Chi Minh Highway.

References

External links
http://www.bietdongquan.com/article1/rgr88.htm Account of history of Dak Pek post 1970

Installations of the United States Army in South Vietnam
Installations of the Army of the Republic of Vietnam
Buildings and structures in Kon Tum province